An electrical junction box (also known as a "jbox") is an enclosure housing electrical connections. Junction boxes protect the electrical connections from the weather, as well as protecting people from accidental electric shocks.

Construction
A small metal or plastic junction box may form part of an electrical conduit or thermoplastic-sheathed cable (TPS) wiring system in a building. If designed for surface mounting, it is used mostly in ceilings, under floors or concealed behind an access panel—particularly in domestic or commercial buildings. An appropriate type (such as that shown in the gallery) may be buried in the plaster of a wall (although full concealment is no longer allowed by modern codes and standards) or cast into concrete—with only the cover visible.

It sometimes includes built-in terminals for the joining of wires.

A similar, usually wall mounted, container used mainly to accommodate switches, sockets and the associated connecting wiring is called a pattress.

The term junction box may also be used for a larger item, such as a piece of street furniture. In the UK, such items are often called a cabinet. See Enclosure (electrical).

Junction boxes form an integral part of a circuit protection system where circuit integrity has to be provided, as for emergency lighting or emergency power lines, or the wiring between a nuclear reactor and a control room. In such an installation, the fireproofing around the incoming or outgoing cables must also be extended to cover the junction box to prevent short circuits inside the box during an accidental fire.

Solar panel

A PV junction box is attached to the back of the solar panel and it is its output interface.

See also
 Cable tray
 Centrex
 Circuit integrity
 Distribution board
 Electric power distribution
 Electrical wiring
 Grounding
 Insulation
 IP Code
 Solar micro-inverter
 Passive fire protection

References

External links

 NEMA: National Electrical Manufacturers Association
 IBEW: International Brotherhood of Electrical Workers
 NECA: National Electrical Contractors Association

Cables
Electrical wiring